The War of the Sicilian Vespers or just War of the Vespers was a conflict that started with the insurrection of the Sicilian Vespers against Charles of Anjou in 1282 and ended in 1302 with the Peace of Caltabellotta. It was fought in Sicily, Catalonia (the Aragonese Crusade) and elsewhere in the western Mediterranean between the kings of Aragon on one side against the Angevin Charles of Anjou, his son Charles II, the kings of France, and the Papacy on the other side. The war resulted in the division of the old Kingdom of Sicily; at Caltabellotta, Charles II was confirmed as king of Sicily's peninsular territories ("Kingdom of Sicily on the other side of the Strait", that is, Naples), while Frederick III was confirmed as king of the island territories ("Kingdom of Sicily across the Strait", that is, Trinacria).

Background

Sicily had been part of a Kingdom of Sicily, which also encompassed the southern Italian peninsula, since the early 12th century, when Roger II of Sicily defeated the Italian mainland barons and was elected king by the pope. His reign had been inherited by Frederick II of Sicily, whose son Manfred was however ousted by the French invasion of Charles I of Anjou in 1266. The French rule soon assumed a repressive and ferocious character.

On Easter Monday (30 March) 1282, at the Church of the Holy Spirit just outside Palermo, at evening prayer (vespers), a Frenchman harassed a Sicilian woman. Accounts differ as to what the harassment entailed, who the woman was, and who the Frenchman was.

This single event led to the massacre of four thousand Frenchmen over the course of the next six weeks. The King of Sicily at the time, Charles I, was an Angevin, and his French followers had a legacy of mistreating the native people of Sicily, especially while Charles was away on one of his many absences. Only a few officials notable for their good conduct were spared; and the city of Messina held out for Charles. But through the diplomatic errors of the vicar, Herbert of Orléans, Messina revolted on April 28 under the command of Captain of the People . Herbert retreated to the castle of Mategriffon and the crusader fleet stationed in the harbour was burned.

The physician John of Procida acted on behalf of Peter of Aragon, the heir of Manfred in right of his wife. John had been a loyal servant of Manfred's and had fled to Aragon after Charles' success at Tagliacozzo. John travelled to Sicily to stir up discontent in favour of Peter and thence to Constantinople to procure the support of Michael VIII Palaeologus. Michael refused to aid the Aragonese king without papal approval and so John voyaged to Rome and there gained the consent of Pope Nicholas III, who feared the ascent of Charles in the Mezzogiorno. John of Procida then returned to Barcelona and the pope promptly died, to be replaced by Simon de Brie, a Frenchman and an ally of Charles.

Aragonese invasion of Italy

Soon after the Vespers itself, the Sicilians turned to Peter of Aragon to deliver them from French dominion. An Aragonese fleet under Peter himself had landed at Collo, now in eastern Algeria, and to those troops the Sicilians sent envoys. Peter was offered the throne of Sicily and accepted. Simon de Brie, who had taken the name Pope Martin IV, had meanwhile refused to help the Sicilian communes and the rebels were excommunicated, as was the Byzantine emperor and the Ghibellines of northern Italy.

Charles gathered his forces, abandoning Crusading hopes, in Calabria and made a landing near Messina and began a siege. Five months after the Vespers, on 30 August, Peter landed at Trapani. He quickly marched into Palermo and, on 4 September, received the homage of the Sicilians and confirmed their ancient privileges. Only the vacancy of the Palermitan archdiocese prevented a coronation. Charles was still besieging Messina when Peter's forces first met him. Charles was forced to vacate the isle by the end of October and was thenceforth restricted to the mainland. The pope then excommunicated the Aragonese king and deprived him of his kingdom (18 November).

Peter pressed his advantage and by February 1283 he had taken most of the Calabrian coastline. Charles, perhaps feeling desperate, sent letters to Peter demanding they resolve the conflict by personal combat. The invader accepted and Charles returned to France to arrange the duel. Both kings chose six knights to settle matters of places and dates. A duel was scheduled for 1 June at Bordeaux. A hundred knights would accompany each side and Edward I of England would adjudge the contest; the English king, heeding the pope, refused to take part. Peter left John of Procida in charge of Sicily and returned via his own kingdom to Bordeaux, which he entered in disguise to evade a suspected French ambush. Needless to say, no combat ever took place and Peter returned to a very troubled Spain.

While Peter and Charles had been pursuing justice by duel in France, the Catalan admiral Roger of Lauria (Ruggiero di Lauria, Roger de Llúria) continued the war in Italy on behalf of Peter. He had been ravaging the Calabrian coast and keeping up a strong naval presence. Charles left Bordeaux for Provence and there sent out a fleet for Naples (his capital in Italy at the time and for the rest of his dynasty). Roger took Malta and defeated the Angevin-Provençal fleet near the islands in the Battle of Malta. Roger then drew Charles the Lame, the son and heir apparent of the Neapolitan king and the Prince of Salerno, out of Naples' port. Roger utterly routed him on the high seas, destroying the whole Angevin navy in the Battle of the Gulf of Naples. Roger took the prince and 42 ships captive to Messina. Charles the elder arrived in Italy at that time, but died soon after in 1285 and the war in Italy was put on hold by the lack of leadership on both sides: Charles' successor was in chains and Peter was dealing with a new menace, the Aragonese Crusade.

Aragonese Crusade

In 1284, Pope Martin granted the kingdom of Aragon to Charles, Count of Valois, the brother of the French king and great nephew of Charles of Sicily. Papal sanction was given to a war—crusade—which historian H. J. Chaytor describes as "perhaps the most unjust, unnecessary and calamitous enterprise ever undertaken by the Capetian monarchy." While Roger of Lauria was still solidifying Peter's gains in Sicily and Calabria, Peter himself had entered France clandestinely to duel Charles, but that failing, returned to his Iberian domains, while Charles re-entered Italy, where he died.

Peter was dealing with domestic unrest at the time the French prepared to invade. He took Albarracín from the rebellious noble Juan Núñez I de Lara, renewed the alliance with Sancho IV of Castile, and attacked Tudela in an attempt to prevent the king of Navarre, Philip I, who was the son of the French king, Philip III the Bold, from invading on that front.

In 1283, Peter's brother, King James II of Majorca, joined the French and recognised their suzerainty over Montpellier giving them free passage through the Balearic Islands and Roussillon. James had also inherited the county of Roussillon and thus stood between the dominions of the French and Aragonese monarchs. Peter had opposed James' inheritance as a younger son and reaped the consequence of such rivalry in the crusade. In 1284, the first French armies under King Philip and Count Charles entered Roussillon. They included 16,000 cavalry, 17,000 crossbowmen, and 100,000 infantry, along with 100 ships in south French ports. Though the French had James' support, the local populace rose against them. The city of Elne was valiantly defended by the so-called bâtard de Roussillon ("bastard of Roussillon"), the illegitimate son of Nuño Sánchez, late count of Roussillon (1212–1242). Eventually he was overcome and the cathedral was burnt, after which the royal forces continued their advance.

In 1285, Philip entrenched himself before Girona in an attempt to besiege it. Despite a strong resistance the city was taken. Charles was crowned there, but without an actual crown. The French soon experienced a reversal, however, at the hands of Roger de Lauria, back from the Italian theatre of the drawn-out conflict. The French fleet was defeated and destroyed at the Battle of Les Formigues. Further the French camp was hit hard by an epidemic of dysentery, and Philip himself was afflicted. The heir to the French throne, the king of Navarre, opened negotiations with Peter for free passage for the royal family through the Pyrenees. But the troops were not offered such passage and were devastated at the Battle of the Col de Panissars. The king of France himself died at Perpignan, the capital of James of Majorca, who had fled in fear after being confronted by Peter, and was buried in Narbonne.

Peter died on 2 November 1285, in the same year as his two royal foes, Charles and Philip. His deathbed absolution occurred after he declared that his conquests had been in the name of his familial claims and never against the claims of the church. After a few more years of general warfare, marked by the Battle of the Counts on 23 June 1287, where the Angevins were defeated near Naples, the Treaty of Tarascon of 1291 officially restored Aragon to his heir, Alfonso, and lifted the ban of the church. 

With the Treaty of Tarascon, the war with Aragon ended, but it had little effect with the death of Alfonso within months. Alfonso's brother, James I of Sicily, inherited Aragon and united the two realms.

Sicily against Naples and Aragon

In 1295, James signed the Treaty of Anagni whereby he gave up Sicily to the papacy, with Pope Boniface VIII granting it to Charles. However, Peter III's third son, Frederick of Sicily, refused to surrender the island to the Angevins, prompting fresh crusading against Frederick and Aragonese Sicily.

The treaty obligated James to enter the war in assistance of Charles and he sent his fleet from Catalonia to harass his brother's coasts. Frederick went on the offensive quickly and invaded Calabria in 1296. He seized several towns, encouraged revolt in Naples, negotiated with the Ghibellines of Tuscany and Lombardy, and assisted the house of Colonna against the pope.

James was very serious about fulfilling his part of the treaty of 1295 and enforcing a peace. In this he had the support of John of Procida and Roger of Lauria, his father's ablest men. On 4 July 1299, James himself led his fleet with Roger of Lauria and defeated his brother at the Battle of Cape Orlando. Meanwhile, Charles' sons, Robert (who had married James' daughter) and Philip, had landed in Sicily and captured Catania. Philip moved to besiege Trapani, but was defeated and captured by Frederick at the Battle of Falconaria. Frederick multiplied his successes in Calabria. On 14 June 1300, Roger of Lauria defeated the Sicilians again at the Battle of Ponza. Frederick himself was captured in battle.

In 1302, Charles of Valois came down into Italy at the behest of Pope Boniface. He landed in Sicily, but his army was ravaged by the plague and forced to sue for peace. On 19 August, the Peace of Caltabellotta was signed. Frederick was recognised as king over Sicily, with the title of King of Trinacria, but to keep the Ghibelline legacy of the Staufer alive he subsequently preferred to call himself "King" without any territorial reference in his chancellery acts from 1304–1311, then used "King of Sicily" from 1315 to 1318, and struck coins throughout his reign as rex Sicilie. Charles was recognised as king over the peninsula, with the title of King of Sicily, usually rendered by historians as "King of Naples," for such was his capital. In May 1303, the pope ratified the treaty and Frederick paid him tribute. Marriage was arranged between Frederick and Charles' daughter Eleanor.

Popular culture
 The 1838 French play Les vêpres siciliennes written by Eugène Scribe and Charles Duveyrier. In 1855 Giuseppe Verdi set it to music as the opera I vespri siciliani. In 1949 an Italian film Sicilian Uprising was released, directed by Giorgio Pastina.
 A popular theory holds that the Mafia began with the Sicilian Vespers and is an abbreviation for "Morte Alla Francia Italia Anelia!" ("Death to the French is Italy's Cry"). However, this is highly unlikely as Sicilians did not consider themselves to be Italians in the 13th century. The first reference to the term Mafia dates from 1862.

Notes

Sources

Primary
The Rebellamentu di Sichilia, a Sicilian tract of 1290, is available online in three editions:
 Lu rebellamentu di Sichilia. Codice della Biblioteca regionale di Palermo. Edited by Filippo Evola (1882).
 Le vespro siciliano. Cronaca siciliana anonima intitolata Lu rebellamentu di Sichilia, codice esistente nell' Archivio municipale di Catania. Edited by Pasquale Castorina (1882).
 Sicily's Rebellion against King Charles. Translation of the text of the "Rebellamentu" by Louis Mendola (New York 2015) .

The Vinuta di lu re Iapicu in Catania, another Sicilian history, by Atanasiu di Iaci, is available online:
 Romanzo siculo del 1287. Edited by Bernardino Biondelli (1856).

The contemporary Catalan chroniclers:
 Bernat Desclot, Crònica, ed. Ferran Soldevila, Jordi Bruguera and Maria Teresa Ferrer i Mallol, Barcelona 2008
 Ramon Muntaner, Crònica, ed. Ferran Soldevila, Jordi Bruguera and Maria Teresa Ferrer i Mallol, Barcelona 2011 (English tr. Anna Kinsky Goodenough, Chronicle of Muntaner, London 1920)

Note also:
 Bruni, Leonardo. History of the Florentine People. 1416.  (Harvard, 2001)

Secondary
  (vol. 1, vol. 2, vol. 3) (English tr. of 2nd (?) edn. Francis Egerton, History of the War of Sicilian Vespers, 3 vols., London 1850: vol. 1, vol. 2, vol. 3)
 (vol. 1, vol. 2)
 
 
 
  
 
 
 
 
 
 
 
 
 
 
 

 
1280s conflicts
1290s conflicts
1300s conflicts
13th century in the Kingdom of Sicily
Military history of Catalonia
Warfare of the Middle Ages
Wars involving the Kingdom of Naples
Wars involving France
13th-century military history of France
14th-century military history of France
1280s in Europe
1290s in Europe
1300s in Europe
Military history of Sicily
Wars involving the Byzantine Empire
Charles I of Anjou